The 2023 Women's FIH Hockey Junior World Cup will be the tenth edition of the Women's FIH Hockey Junior World Cup, the biennial women's under-21 field hockey world championship organized by the International Hockey Federation. It will be held in Santiago, Chile from 6 to 17 December 2023.

Qualification
Alongside the hosts, Chile, the 15 other teams will qualify via the continental championships.

See also
2023 Men's FIH Hockey Junior World Cup

References

 
Women's Hockey Junior World Cup
Junior World Cup
International women's field hockey competitions hosted by Chile
FIH Hockey Junior World Cup
FIH Hockey World Cup
Sports competitions in Santiago
Junior World Cup
FIH Hockey Junior World Cup